Echidnas are Australian egg-laying mammals also known as spiny anteaters.

Echidna may also refer to:

Echidna (mythology), monster in Greek mythology and namesake of the mammal
(42355) Typhon I Echidna, the natural satellite of the asteroid 42355 Typhon
ECHIDNA, high-resolution neutron powder diffractometer at Australia's research reactor OPAL
Echidna (Re:Zero), a character in the light novel series Re:Zero − Starting Life in Another World 
Echidna, character in the video game The Bouncer

Taxonomic genera
Echidna (fish) , a genus of moray eels
Echidna , a junior homonym referring to the mammals commonly known as echidnas
Echidna , junior homonym for a genus of African snakes now treated as Bitis

See also
Knuckles the Echidna, character from the Sonic the Hedgehog video game series
Echidna Parass, fictional character from the Black Cat series

Taxonomy disambiguation pages